Prosopis africana is a flowering plant species in the genus Fabaceae. It is found in Africa. Its common names include African mesquite, iron tree, gele (Malinke) (traditional djembe wood) or somb tree.OKPEHE is the name given by the IDOMA/IGALA people of Nigeria to both the tree and it's fermented/processed seeds. All the other derivatives (such as okpeye, okpiye) are adulterations of the original name OKPEHE given by the IDOMA people of present day Benue state of Nigeri.

In the Serer creation myth, it is one of the sacred trees that grew not just first, but also within the primordial swamp on Earth.

Seeds of P. africana are used in Nigeria to prepare daddawa, kpaye or okpeye, fermented products used as food condiments. Several species of bacteria especially Bacillus subtilis, Bacillus licheniformis, Bacillus megaterium, Staphylococcus epidermidis and Micrococcus spp. were found to be the most actively involved organisms in the production of okpiye. Sequencing of 16S rRNA genes of selected strains representative of the major clusters revealed that the Bacillus strains associated with okpehe fermentation were B. subtilis, B. amyloliquefaciens, B. cereus and B. licheniformis (in decreasing order of incidence). The presence of enterotoxin genes in all B. cereus strains was demonstrated by multiplex PCR. The high incidence of detection (20%) of possibly pathogenic B. cereus strains that contained enterotoxin genes indicated that these fermented foods may constitute a potential health risk.

The seeds also produce a gum.

The plant produces the alkaloids prosopine and prosopinine.

References

External links

africana
Trees of Africa
Flora of West Tropical Africa
Flora of West-Central Tropical Africa
Plants described in 1893